"There Goes a Tenner" is a song by the English singer Kate Bush. It was released as a single on 2 November 1982, the third to be taken from her album The Dreaming. It was released as a 7-inch single in the UK and Ireland only.

Background
"There Goes a Tenner" is often considered to be something of a "lost single" because when it was released, the single gained no interest from any radio stations nor did the song's video on music television programmes. Due to this lack of media interest, the single did not sell well and became Bush's first single to miss the top 75 in the UK, peaking at number 93. It was originally intended to be Bush's first twelve-inch single, but its disappointing sales performance caused plans for the 12-inch to be cancelled.

The song's lyrics are about a bungled bank robbery as told by a fearful and paranoid perpetrator. As Bush stated; "It's about amateur robbers who have only done small things, and this is quite a big robbery that they've been planning for months, and when it actually starts happening, they start freaking out. They're really scared, and they're so aware of the fact that something could go wrong that they're paranoid and want to go home." Towards the end of the song, the lyrics and tone take on a dream-like state, which is reflected in the video. A review in Record Mirror commented that despite the comic tone of the song, the end left a rather unnerving effect. Bush sang it in what has been described as "a curious accent that seemed to veer from an aristocrat to an East End villain" (see mockney).

The B-side, "Ne t'enfuis pas" ("Don't Run Away") is spelt incorrectly on the actual single as "Ne T'en Fui Pas", which has no meaning in French.

Personnel
Kate Bush – piano, Fairlight CMI, Yamaha CS-80, vocals
Del Palmer – bass guitar
Stuart Elliott – drums
Dave Lawson – Synclavier

References

Kate Bush songs
1982 singles
Songs written by Kate Bush
EMI Records singles
1982 songs
Novelty songs